The Basset Fauve de Bretagne is a short-legged hunting breed of dog of the scent hound type, originally from Brittany, a historical duchy of France.

Description

Appearance
The Basset Fauve de Bretagne is a smallish hound, built along the same lines as the Basset Hound, but lighter all through and longer in the leg. Wire-coated, the coat is very harsh to the touch, dense, red-wheaten or fawn. They measure 32 – 38 cm in height and weigh between 36 - 40 lbs but due to the historically controversial practice of registering mixed litters of Griffon and Basset Fauves, sometimes a litter of bassets will produce dogs with long legs. They have coarse, dense fur which may require stripping. Although their coat repels dirt and does not mat easily, they still require weekly combing and brushing. The hair on the ears is shorter, finer and darker than that on the coat. The ears just reach the end of the nose rather than trailing on the ground and should be pleated. They should have dark eyes and nose and ideally no crook on the front legs. The French standard says these are the shortest backed of all the basset breeds so they generally do not appear as exaggerated as the British Basset.

Temperament

Health

Mortality
Based on a small sample size of 15 deceased dogs, Basset Fauve de Bretagnes in the 2004 UK Kennel Club survey had a median longevity of 10.4 years (maximum 13.9 years), which is a typical median longevity for purebred dogs, but a little low compared to other breeds of similar size. Most common causes of death were road traffic accidents, cancer, heart failure, and kidney failure. The high incidence of road traffic accidents may be perhaps blamed on this dog's love of the scent. Many pet Basset Fauves go AWOL when they find a scent, and this character trait is something an owner must never forget. Basset Fauves can be trained very well in a controlled environment, but training is rapidly forgotten once a fresh rabbit trail is found.

Morbidity
Among 84 live dogs in the 2004 UKC survey, the most common health issues noted by owners were reproductive, aural (otitis media and otitis externa), and ocular (corneal ulcers and cataracts).

History
The breed was developed in France as a hunting dog from the larger Grand Fauve de Bretagne, a breed that is now extinct. There was a rumour that the Basset Fauve de Bretagne was also close to extinction after the Second World War, and the breed was recreated using the remaining examples of the breed and crossing in standard wirehaired Dachshunds. However, the French club denies this, and says that Basset Fauve numbers were never so low. The middle-sized breed, the Griffon Fauve de Bretagne, also still exists, but it is certainly rarer than the Basset Fauve. The breed in the UK is mainly seen as a show dog and family pet, finally coming off the Kennel Club's rare breed register in 2007. It can also be found in other parts of Europe where it is used to scent trail and also as a family pet. They are loving, happy, outgoing dogs and are good with children, but it must be remembered that they are scenthounds and do retain their love of the hunt, so they may not suit every family. In the UK the breed has no hereditary faults; however, epilepsy has been identified in some breeding lines in France and other parts of Europe. Some Basset Fauves are born with black in the coat; this may or may not go with maturity. It is less common to see them with white patches, but when they do occur, it is generally confined to the chest and top of the head. However, even though the black ticking and white patches are not accepted colours, of course it does not interfere with their hunting ability, which is their prime job, and so these coloured Basset Fauves are still seen and occur fairly often in litters. The correct colour for a Basset Fauve is anything from fawn to red, but it should be solid with darker shaded ears.

See also
 Dogs portal
 List of dog breeds
Basset Hound
Basset Bleu de Gascogne
Grand Basset Griffon Vendéen
Petit Basset Griffon Vendéen
Basset Artésien Normand
Griffon Fauve de Bretagne
Coat (dog)
Rare breed (dog)

References

FCI breeds
Rare dog breeds
Scent hounds
Dog breeds originating in France